Don't Look Up is a 2021 American apocalyptic political satire black comedy film written, co-produced, and directed by Adam McKay from a story he co-wrote with David Sirota. It stars an ensemble cast featuring Leonardo DiCaprio, Jennifer Lawrence, Rob Morgan, Jonah Hill, Mark Rylance, Tyler Perry, Timothée Chalamet, Ron Perlman, Ariana Grande, Kid Cudi, Cate Blanchett, and Meryl Streep. The film tells the story of two astronomers attempting to warn humanity about an approaching comet that will destroy human civilization. The impact event is an allegory for climate change, and the film is a satire of government, political, celebrity, and media indifference to the climate crisis.

Produced by McKay's Hyperobject Industries and Bluegrass Films, the film was announced in November 2019. Originally set for a theatrical release by Paramount Pictures, the distribution rights were acquired by Netflix several months later. Lawrence became the first member of the cast to join, with DiCaprio signing on after his discussions with McKay on adjustments to the script; the rest of the cast was added through 2020. Filming was initially set to begin in April 2020 in Massachusetts, but it was delayed due to the COVID-19 pandemic; it eventually began in November 2020 and wrapped in February 2021. The film began a limited theatrical release on December 10, 2021, before streaming on Netflix on December 24.

Don't Look Up was praised for the cast's performances and the musical score, but critics were divided on the merits of McKay's satire; some found it deft, while others criticized it as smug and heavy-handed. The film was received more positively by scientists. Don't Look Up was named one of the top ten films of 2021 by the National Board of Review and American Film Institute. It received four Academy Award nominations (including Best Picture), four Golden Globe Award nominations (including Best Picture – Musical or Comedy), and six Critics' Choice Award nominations, (including Best Picture), and also won Best Original Screenplay at the 74th Writers Guild of America Awards. The film set a new record for the most viewing hours in a single week on Netflix, and went on to become the second-most-watched movie on Netflix within 28 days of release.

Plot

Kate Dibiasky, an MSU doctoral candidate, discovers a previously unknown comet. Her professor Dr. Randall Mindy confirms that it will collide with the Earth in about six months and is large enough to cause a planet-wide extinction event. NASA confirms the findings and their Planetary Defense Coordination Office head Dr. Teddy Oglethorpe accompanies Dibiasky and Mindy to present their findings to the White House. They are met with apathy from President Janie Orlean and her son/Chief of Staff Jason.

Oglethorpe urges Dibiasky and Mindy to leak the news to the media, and they do so on a morning talk show. When hosts Jack Bremmer and Brie Evantee treat the topic frivolously, Dibiasky loses her composure and rants about the threat. Mindy receives public approval for his looks; conversely, Dibiasky became the subject of negative internet memes. Actual news about the comet's threat receives little public attention and the danger is denied by Orlean's NASA Director Jocelyn Calder, a top donor to Orlean with no background in astronomy. When news of Orlean's sex scandal with her Supreme Court nominee Sheriff Conlon is exposed, she distracts from the bad publicity by finally confirming the threat and announcing a project to strike and divert the comet using nuclear weapons.

The mission successfully launches, but Orlean abruptly aborts it when Peter Isherwell, the billionaire CEO of BASH Cellular and another top donor, discovers that the comet contains trillions of dollars worth of rare-earth elements. The White House agrees to commercially exploit the comet by fragmenting and recovering it from the ocean, using technology proposed by BASH in a scheme that has not undergone peer review. Orlean sidelines Dibiasky and Oglethorpe while hiring Mindy as the National Science Advisor. Dibiasky tries to mobilize public opposition to the scheme but gives up under threat from Orlean's administration. Mindy becomes a prominent voice advocating for the comet's commercial opportunities and begins an affair with Evantee.

World opinion is divided among people who believe the comet is a severe threat, those who decry alarmism and believe that mining a destroyed comet will create jobs, and those who deny that the comet even exists. When Dibiasky returns home to Illinois, her parents kick her out of the house and she begins a relationship with a young man named Yule, a shoplifter she meets at her retail job. After Mindy's wife confronts him about his infidelity, she returns to Michigan without him. Mindy questions whether Isherwell's technology will be able to break apart the comet, angering the billionaire. Becoming frustrated with the administration, Mindy finally snaps and rants on live television, criticizing Orlean for downplaying the impending apocalypse and questioning humanity's indifference.

Cut off from the administration, Mindy reconciles with Dibiasky as the comet becomes visible from Earth. Mindy, Dibiasky, and Oglethorpe organize a protest campaign on social media, telling people to "Just Look Up" and call on other countries to conduct comet interception operations. At the same time, Orlean starts an anti-campaign telling people, "Don't Look Up,". Orlean cuts Russia, India, and China out of the rights for the comet-mining deal, so they prepare their own joint deflection mission, only for their spacecraft to explode. BASH's attempt at breaking the comet apart also goes awry and everyone realizes that humanity is doomed.

Isherwell, Orlean, and others in their elite circle board a sleeper spaceship designed to find an Earth-like planet, inadvertently leaving Jason behind. Orlean offers Mindy two places on the ship, but he declines, choosing to spend a final evening with his friends and family. As expected, the comet strikes off the coast of Chile, causing a worldwide disaster and triggering an extinction-level event. The shockwave strikes Mindy's house, killing everyone inside.

In a mid-credits scene, the 2,000 people who left Earth before the comet's impact land on a lush alien planet 22,740 years later, ending their cryogenic sleep. They exit their spacecraft naked and admiring the habitable world. Orlean is suddenly killed by a bird-like predator, one of a pack that surrounds the planetary newcomers.

Cast

 Leonardo DiCaprio as Dr. Randall Mindy, an astronomy professor at Michigan State University (MSU) and Kate's teacher
 Jennifer Lawrence as Kate Dibiasky, an MSU doctoral candidate in astronomy. Lawrence received top billing in the film's opening credits and was listed first on the call sheet. She recognized that she and DiCaprio shared equal billing, but said that, "maybe somewhere down the line, I kicked the stone further, like, 'What if it wasn't equal?.
 Rob Morgan as Dr. Teddy Oglethorpe, head of the Planetary Defense Coordination Office
 Jonah Hill as Jason Orlean, Chief of Staff and President Orlean's son. About his inspiration for his character, Hill wrote, "I thought, what if Fyre Festival was a person and that person had power in the White House".
 Sir Mark Rylance as Peter Isherwell, the billionaire CEO of the fictitious tech company BASH and one of Orlean's top donors
 Tyler Perry as Jack Bremmer, the co-host of The Daily Rip morning talk show
 Timothée Chalamet as Yule, a young shoplifter whom Kate befriends
 Ron Perlman as Colonel Benedict Drask, war veteran and Presidential Medal of Freedom recipient who is sent up with the initial launch to divert the comet
 Ariana Grande as Riley Bina, an international music star
 Kid Cudi as DJ Chello, an international music star who becomes Riley's fiancé on The Daily Rip
 Himesh Patel as Phillip Kaj, a journalist at Autopsy and Kate's boyfriend
 Melanie Lynskey as June Mindy, Dr. Randall Mindy's wife
 Michael Chiklis as Dan Pawketty, host of the conservative Patriot News Network 
 Tomer Sisley as Adul Grelio, senior editor at the New York Herald
 Paul Guilfoyle as US Air Force Lieutenant General Stuart Themes, The Pentagon liaison to the White House
 Robert Joy as Congressman Tenant, a congressman and follower of Janie
 Cate Blanchett as Brie Evantee, co-host of The Daily Rip
 Meryl Streep as Janie Orlean, the President of the United States
 Kevin Craig West as Secretary of State

Other cast members include Erik Parillo as Sheriff Conlon, Orlean's choice for Supreme Court Justice who ends up in a sex scandal with Orlean; Jon Glaser as Meow Man; Sarah Nolen as the puppeteer of Sammy; Allyn Burrows as Mr. Dibiasky, the father of Kate; and Tori Davis Lawlor as Mrs. Dibiasky, the mother of Kate.

Additionally, Robert Hurst Radochia and Conor Sweeney appear as Randall and June's sons, Evan and Marshall Mindy. Hettienne Park appears as Dr. Jocelyn Calder, the Administrator of NASA. There are cameo appearances by Liev Schreiber as the BASH narrator, journalist Ashleigh Banfield as Dalia Hensfield, Sarah Silverman as comedian Sarah Benterman, Bollywood actor Ishaan Khatter as Raghav Manavalan, and Chris Evans (uncredited) as film actor Devin Peters, who stars in the film Total Devastation and attempts to be a centrist about whether or not to worry about the failure to divert the comet when humanity had the chance. Matthew Perry and Gina Gershon were cast for roles in the film, but had their scenes cut.

Production
Produced by Hyperobject Industries and Bluegrass Films, the film was announced in November 2019 and sold by Paramount Pictures to Netflix several months later. Lawrence became the first member of the cast to join, with DiCaprio signing on after his discussions with McKay on adjustments to the script; the rest of the cast was added through 2020.

After Vice was released, David Sirota asked Adam McKay to use his "superpowers of humor and writing" to create a climate change movie that would be different from the Mad Max-type post-apocalyptic films that had previously been released. In an interview with Entertainment Weekly, McKay described how he and Sirota came up with the premise of Don't Look Up while discussing the existential threat of climate change and their frustration over the lack of media coverage it was receiving:

I started talking to a lot of [climate] scientists. I kept looking for good news, and I never got it. Everything I was hearing was worse than what I was hearing on the mainstream media. So I was talking to [David Sirota], and we were both just like, "can you believe that this isn't being covered in the media? That it's being pushed to the end of the story? That there's no headlines?" And Sirota just offhandedly said, "it's like a comet is heading to Earth and it's going to destroy us all and no one cares." And I was like, "that's the idea!"

McKay has described the film as a "blend of broad comedy" with elements of disaster films and horror films.

Astronomer Amy Mainzer, principal investigator of NASA's NEOWISE mission that tracks Near-Earth objects, served as an "astrotech adviser" for the film. She provided scientific advice and supported with writing scenes from an early stage of production.

On November 8, 2019, it was announced that Paramount Pictures would distribute the film, with Adam McKay writing, directing, and producing under his Hyperobject Industries banner. On February 19, 2020, Netflix acquired the film from Paramount and Jennifer Lawrence was cast in the film. On May 12, 2020, it was announced that Cate Blanchett had joined the film. In September 2020, Rob Morgan joined the cast. In October 2020, Leonardo DiCaprio, Meryl Streep, Jonah Hill, Himesh Patel, Timothée Chalamet, Ariana Grande, Kid Cudi (Scott Mescudi), and Tomer Sisley were added. McKay wrote the part of Dibiasky specifically for Lawrence, and spent four to five months going over ideas with DiCaprio, tweaking the script before the actor ultimately signed on. In November 2020, Tyler Perry, Melanie Lynskey, and Ron Perlman joined the cast. Mark Rylance and Michael Chiklis were revealed as part of the cast in February 2021. Paul Guilfoyle was announced in May. Matthew Perry had scenes filmed with Hill that were ultimately cut from the final film. Gina Gershon also filmed a scene with DiCaprio and Blanchett that was cut from the film. Leonardo DiCaprio received top billing on the film's posters and the trailers while Jennifer Lawrence was accorded top billing at the beginning of the film itself. This was also the case with earlier productions The Man Who Shot Liberty Valance (1962) with James Stewart and John Wayne and All the President's Men (1976) with Robert Redford and Dustin Hoffman.

Principal photography was delayed due to the COVID-19 pandemic. Filming commenced on November 18, 2020, at various locations in Boston, Massachusetts. Part of the film takes place in New York City with Boston standing in as New York. Filming also took place in other Massachusetts cities including Brockton, Framingham, and Westborough. On February 5, 2021, Jennifer Lawrence was mildly injured during filming when a controlled glass explosion went awry. On February 18, 2021, principal photography wrapped.

Music 

To promote the film, Ariana Grande and Kid Cudi released the single "Just Look Up" on December 3, 2021, a song that is also performed in the film. The original score for the film is composed by Nicholas Britell who previously scored McKay's The Big Short (2015), Vice (2018) and the HBO television series Succession (2019–2022); McKay was the executive producer. He used a wide range of instrumentation that reflect varied music styles and genres. This is did, so as to give a remainder on the existential crisis on the planet following a catastrophic event as well as the absurdity of how people react to it. Apart from "Just Look Up", the film also featured "Second Nature" by Bon Iver, which released along with Britell's score album on December 10, by Republic Records.

Release
On February 19, 2020, it was announced Netflix planned to release the film in 2020. Due to the COVID-19 pandemic, filming and release of the film were delayed. The film premiered in New York City on December 5, 2021. It received a limited theatrical release on December 10, and began streaming on Netflix on December 24. The film made an estimated $260,000 from 500 theaters on its first day, and a total of $700,000 in its opening weekend.

Audience viewership 
Don't Look Up was the most-streamed English-language film on Netflix during the week of December 20–26, 2021 with a viewership of 111.03 million hours, the second highest viewership for a movie during its debut weekend on Netflix. It was the second most-streamed-film of the week in the United States according to TV Time. Per Nielsen, the film had a viewership of 1.6 billion minutes in the United States. In the second week, it retained its first position with a viewership of 152.29 million hours, which also set the record for highest weekly viewership for any film ever on Netflix. It was the second most-streamed-film in the United States according to Nielsen with a viewership of 2 billion minutes, with its rise compared to previous week driven by a more even audience share among the 18–34, 35–49 and 50–64 age ranges.

The film retained its position on Netflix in third week with a viewership of 58.2 million hours. Per Nielsen it was the second most-streamed-film in the United States during the week with 807 million minutes viewed. In the fourth week it was displaced to the second position on Netflix's chart while garnering a viewership of 28.39 million hours. In the fifth week, which concluded 30 days after the film was released, it fell to the third position while garnering a viewership of 17.13 million hours. According to Nielsen, it was the sixth-most-streamed-film for the week with 278 million minutes viewed. For its first 28 days, it culminated a viewership of 359.8 million hours, making it the second most-watched film within 28 days of release on Netflix during this period of time.

In the sixth week, it was ranked fourth on Netflix with a viewership of 10.25 million hours. According to Nielsen, it was the ninth most-streamed film in the United States with a viewership of 165 million minutes. The following week, it fell to the seventh place in Netflix's rankings, while being viewed for 6.93 million hours. In the eighth week, it was ranked tenth with a viewership of 5.34 million hours. By March 20 the film had been streamed in 10.3 million households in the United States according to Samba TV, including 641,000 since the Oscar nomination announcements on February 8.

Reception

Critical response 
 

 

The San Francisco Chronicle Mick LaSalle praised the film and wrote, "Don't Look Up might be the funniest movie of 2021. It's the most depressing too, and that odd combination makes for a one-of-a-kind experience... McKay gives you over two hours of laughs while convincing you that the world is coming to an end." Richard Roeper of the Chicago Sun-Times gave the film 2.5 out of 4 stars and said: "From Streep and DiCaprio and Lawrence through the supporting players, Don't Look Up is filled with greatly talented actors really and truly selling this material—but the volume remains at 11 throughout the story when some changes in tone here and there might have more effectively carried the day." Reviewing the film for the Los Angeles Times, Justin Chang wrote, "Nothing about the foolishness and outrageousness of what the movie shows us—no matter how virtuosically sliced and diced by McKay's characteristically jittery editor, Hank Corwin—can really compete with the horrors of our real-world American idiocracy." Amit Katwala of Wired concluded that "Don't Look Up nails the frustration of being a scientist." Linda Marric of The Jewish Chronicle gave the film 4/5 stars, writing: "There is something genuinely endearing about a film that doesn't seem to care one bit about coming across as silly as long as its message is heard". Shruti Kotiya of Sportskeeda, suggests that "Don't Look Up also feels similar to Mike Judge's Idiocracy, which is set in 2505 America, where mindless entertainment and violence are what really matter. It also sheds light on how the world's collective IQ has hit its lowest, which is why Don't Look Up is like a 21st-century version of it."

In a negative review, David Rooney of The Hollywood Reporter called the film "A cynical, insufferably smug satire stuffed to the gills with stars that purports to comment on political and media inattention to the climate crisis but really just trivializes it. Dr. Strangelove it ain't." Peter Debruge of Variety called the film a "smug, easy-target political satire" and wrote, "Don't Look Up plays like the leftie answer to Armageddon—which is to say, it ditches the Bruckheimer approach of assembling a bunch of blue-collar heroes to rocket out to space and nuke the approaching comet, opting instead to spotlight the apathy, incompetence and financial self-interest of all involved." In The Guardian, Charles Bramesco wrote that the "script states the obvious as if everyone else is too stupid to realize it and does so from a position of lofty superiority that would drive away any partisans who still need to be won over." Reviews from right-wing publications were nearly unanimously negative. Madeline Fry Schultz of the American conservative publication Washington Examiner wrote that "McKay manages to deliver nothing more than a derivative and meandering "satire" of capitalism, Donald Trump, and climate deniers that will be forgotten in less than six months." Kyle Smith of American conservative publication National Review wrote that the film "expends 140 brain-injuriously unfunny minutes... propelling low-velocity spitballs at social media, Washington, tech moguls, Trumpism, and (this detail feels thrown in last minute) anti-vaxxers."

Nathan J. Robinson, editor of American progressive publication Current Affairs, believes that "critics were not only missing the point of the film in important ways, but that the very way they discussed the film exemplified the problem that the film was trying to draw attention to. Some of the responses to the movie could have appeared in the movie itself." Slavoj Žižek, writing in Compact, said that "critics were displeased by the light tone of Don't Look Up!, claiming it trivializes the ultimate apocalypse. What really bothered these critics is the exact opposite: The film highlights trivialization that permeates not only the establishment, but even the protesters." In The Guardian, Catherine Bennett viewed the film as astute and was caustic about the critical reviews. Writing for the American socialist publication Jacobin, Branko Marcetic says that the plot of the film, while absurd, hardly exaggerates, noting that "much of our political elite are just as greedy and foolish, our media just as vapid, and our response to impending disaster exactly as mind-bogglingly irrational as in the movie." British journalist and environmental activist George Monbiot wrote in The Guardian that "no wonder journalists have slated it … it's about them" and added that for environmental activists like himself, the film, while fastpaced and humorous, "seemed all too real".

Bong Joon-ho, director of Snowpiercer and Parasite, included Don't Look Up as one of his favorite films of 2021.

Reception among scientists 
Since the film's release, numerous climate scientists and climate communicators have offered positive opinions on the film.

In an opinion piece published in The Guardian, climate scientist Peter Kalmus remarked, "Don't Look Up is satire. But speaking as a climate scientist doing everything I can to wake people up and avoid planetary destruction, it's also the most accurate film about society's terrifying non-response to climate breakdown I've seen."  Climate scientist Michael E. Mann also expressed support for the film, calling it "serious sociopolitical commentary posing as comedy".  In an article for Scientific American, Rebecca Oppenheimer questioned the film's use of a comet impact as an effective metaphor for climate change, given the large differences in timescale of these differing potential extinction crisis events and the nature of their impacts, but praised its depiction of science denialism and depiction of a botched attempt to address a "planet-killer" comet. Climate policy expert Ayana Elizabeth Johnson and McKay wrote a joint op-ed in The Guardian advocating for the value of humour in promoting action on climate change, in contrast with other media coverage.

Writing in Physics World, Laura Hiscott said that this "genuinely funny and entertaining film" would appeal to scientists, who would appreciate the "nods to academia such as the importance of peer review, the 'publish or perish' problem and the issue of senior academics getting the credit for their PhD students’ discoveries".

One of the scenes in the film was compared on social media to a situation in Brazil. In that situation, microbiologist and science communicator Natália Pasternak Taschner criticized a news report made by TV Cultura on a live broadcast in December 2020. They told the Brazilian population to face the COVID-19 pandemic with "lightness", minimizing the risks. They also put pressure on the public to be content and uncritical of the Jair Bolsonaro administration's lack of effective response to the pandemic. Hearing about the comparisons, Pasternak thanked McKay, DiCaprio and Lawrence on Twitter with the video subtitled in English to thank them for the "incredible" film.

Accolades

Analysis and themes 

The topic of science communication is at the forefront of the film, as it revolves around Mindy and Dibiasky, two scientists, struggling to share the news of their discovery with politicians, talk show hosts, and civilians who are ignorant about the scientific facts of humanity's impending destruction by Comet Dibiasky. Many academic scholars of media and communication have written commentaries that analyze and critique the portrayal of science communication in the film.

U.S. centrism 
In the Journal of Science Communication, Niels G. Mede writes "the film depicts sharp partisan divides, strong affective polarization, high distrust toward science within certain social milieus, and pronounced news media sensationalism, which have been found to be characteristic of the United States but not, or to a lesser extent, of several countries other than the US." From the same journal, writer Julie Doyle remarked that, "yet, as the film critiques existing structures and systems it does not imagine an alternative set of realities, nor explain the comet’s cause. In focusing upon the fictional stories of scientists, politicians, and media celebrities, the film fails to center any marginalized voices, continuing to privilege global north perspectives, even as these are satirised." Doyle comments that "climate communication needs to keep in place both climate mitigation and adaptation, making the historical and structural inequalities of capitalism and colonialism the interconnected stories of both."

Media training for scientists 
One solution to Mindy and Dibiasky's failed attempts to communicate the severity of the upending comet is undergoing media training, which was brought up in the film multiple times, such as at the conference room at the New York Herald where the Chief Editor proposes media training to Mindy before the show. The concept of media training can come in different forms. Samer Angelone from a commentary journal on science communication writes, because "The style that scientists use to communicate science to peer scientists is mostly objective, complex, and full of technical jargon, which is difficult for the general public to connect to—even if it is in the same language." Another way to mitigate science skepticism is through storytelling. Mede writes, "The film also illustrates that storytelling can be a promising strategy to mitigate these reservations..., showing how Mindy is advised before a TV interview that he is 'just telling a story' and must 'keep it simple.'"

Gendered emotions in scientific communication 
Gendered discourse on emotions and mental health make its way into the film through the portrayal of the public's reaction to Mindy and Dibiasky's various media appearances. The scientists share their discovery on a morning talk show, The Daily Rip, in which Dibiasky has an emotional outburst over the show hosts' persistent attempts to sugarcoat the devastating news of the doomsday comet. Professor of media and communication Julie Doyle writes, "Gendered norms affect Mindy and Dibiasky's public credibility and the mitigatory comet actions they promote. Following his own emotional outburst on TV, Mindy is subsequently recuperated through processes of celebritisation...hailed as a 'sexy' scientist offering rational and calm advise to the viewers; becoming chief science advisor to the White House to monitor the drone activities of tech billionaire Peter Isherwell; and embarking on a sexual affair with Evantee. In contrast, Dibiasky is discredited and side-lined from rational public commentary through (climate) memes."

Easter eggs 
Throughout the film, many historic figures from science and politics can be spotted, adding to the film's nuanced discussion about the relationship between science and politics.

The opening scene of the film features a figure of Carl Sagan on Dibiasky's desk. In a journal commentary for Science Communication, Samer Angelone writes that “Sagan was an astronomer, planetary scientist, cosmologist, astrophysicist, and astrobiologist but, above all, he was an upholder of scientific credibility and communication.” Sagan advocated for the urgency to battle climate change, and many viewers see the film as an allegory for him, but his image is juxtaposed by a painting of George W. Bush, "who later tried to downplay this urgency." The film also "references the affinity of anti-science resentment and populism, showing how President Orlean and her team slander Mindy and Dibiasky using populist rhetoric...and gather in an Oval Office that has a portrait of the anti-establishment science skeptic Andrew Jackson."

The film ends with a scene that reflects the Last Supper. Dr. Mindy, his family, Kate, Yule, and Teddy all sit around a dinner table and engage in a hand-held prayer, spoken by Yule. After the prayer, Kate Dibiasky gives Yule a kiss, and moments later Comet Dibiasky destroys Earth. The scene also resembles a Hieronymus Bosch painting.

See also
Double Asteroid Redirection Test – a real NASA mission to test deflection of an asteroid in 2022
Climate change in popular culture

Notes

References

External links

 
 
 Official screenplay
 

2020s English-language films
2020s satirical films
2021 comedy films
American science fiction comedy films
American survival films
Apocalyptic films
Climate change films
Comets in film
English-language Netflix original films
Film productions suspended due to the COVID-19 pandemic
Films about American politics
Films about astronomy
Films about conspiracy theories
Films directed by Adam McKay
Films produced by Adam McKay
Films scored by Nicholas Britell
Films set in Illinois
Films set in Michigan
Films set in New York City
Films set in the White House
Films set in Washington, D.C.
Films shot in Boston
Films shot in Massachusetts
Films with screenplays by Adam McKay
Films about impact events
2020s American films